Beechtree is an unincorporated community in Jefferson County, in the U.S. state of Pennsylvania.

History
Beechtree was originally a mining community. A post office was established at Beechtree in 1882, and remained in operation until 1909.

References

Unincorporated communities in Jefferson County, Pennsylvania
Unincorporated communities in Pennsylvania